FTCD may refer to: 

 Formimidoyltransferase cyclodeaminase (symbol FTCD), an enzyme
 Functional transcranial Doppler (fTCD) sonography, a type of transcranial Doppler sonography
 Fellow of Trinity College, Dublin (List of post-nominal letters (Ireland))